Piero Sfiligoi (born 3 June 1994) is an Italian lightweight rower. He won a gold medal at the 2017 World Rowing Championships in Sarasota with the lightweight men's four.

References

External links
 

1994 births
Living people
Italian male rowers
World Rowing Championships medalists for Italy
European Rowing Championships medalists